The Chon Aike Formation is an extensive geological formation, present in the Deseado Massif in north-central Santa Cruz Province, Patagonia, Argentina. Within dacitic rocks, plant fossils have been found.

Description 

The northern part of the formation, Río Pinturas, has been dated to the Late Jurassic (140–160 ), while the western and eastern sections have been dated to 162 ± 11 Ma and 168 ± 2 Ma respectively, indicating Middle Jurassic eruptions. Fossil flora, however, suggests a Middle to Late Jurassic age. (See La Matilde Formation.)

During the break-up of Gondwana around 180–165 Ma, the opening of the Weddell Sea lead to extension along the western margin of the South American Plate, resulting in intra-plate volcanism in the Chon Aike area and rifting in the Magallanes Basin.
The Chon Aike volcanism was probably related to the subduction of the Pacific Phoenix and Farallon plates.

According to Riley, "Early Jurassic silicic volcanic rocks of the Chon Aike Province (V1: 187-182 Ma) are recognized from many localities in the southern Antarctic Peninsula and northeast Patagonia and are essentially coeval with the extensive Karoo (182 Ma) and Ferrar (183 Ma) large igneous provinces of pre-breakup Gondwana.

See also 
 Karoo-Ferrar
Pinturas River Canyon
Cueva de las Manos

References

Bibliography

Further reading 
 R. E. Barrio, O.G. Arrondo, A.E. Artabe and B. Petriella. 1982. Estudio geologico y paleontologico de los alrededores de la Estancia Bajo Pellegrini, Provincia de Santa Cruz. Revista del Asociacion Geologica Argentina 37(3):285-299

Geologic formations of Argentina
Jurassic System of South America
Lower Cretaceous Series of South America
Jurassic Argentina
Cretaceous Argentina
Tithonian Stage
Berriasian Stage
Tuff formations
Cretaceous volcanism
Jurassic volcanism
Formations
Fossiliferous stratigraphic units of South America
Paleontology in Argentina
Geology of Santa Cruz Province, Argentina
Geology of Patagonia
Geology of Tierra del Fuego